Anadia vittata, Boulenger's anadia, is a species of lizard in the family Gymnophthalmidae. It is found in Panama and Colombia.

References

Anadia (genus)
Reptiles described in 1913
Taxa named by George Albert Boulenger